The second series of Ex on the Beach Poland, a Polish television programme, began airing on 10 April 2017 on MTV. The show was announced in 6 March 2017. Cast member for this series include Warsaw Shore star Piotr Polak. The series was filmed in Croatia.

Cast 
The official list of cast members was released on 27 March 2017 and includes four single boys: Damian Graf, Filip Ćwiek, Jacob Urbanowicz and Warsaw Shore cast member Piotr Polak; as well as four single girls; Kornelia Anna, Lena Bator, Martyna Chmielewska and Patrycja Dillinger. With the announcement of the line-up it was confirmed that Ex on the Beach Poland cast member and star of the first series, Jola Mróz, would be making her return as an ex alongside star Piotr Polak. Warsaw Shore cast member Magda Pyznar was also confirmed to be taking part in the series featuring as an ex.

Bold indicates original cast member; all other cast were brought into the series as an ex.

Duration of cast

Notes 
 Key:  = "Cast member" is featured in this episode.
 Key:  = "Cast member" arrives on the beach.
 Key:  = "Cast member" has an ex arrive on the beach.
 Key:  = "Cast member" leaves the beach.
 Key:  = "Cast member" does not feature in this episode.

Episodes

References 

2017 Polish television seasons
Poland (series 2)